Bauchi State (Fula: Leydi Bauchi 𞤤𞤫𞤴𞤣𞤭 𞤦𞤢𞤵𞤷𞥅𞤭) is a state in the North-East geopolitical zone of Nigeria, bordered by Kano and Jigawa to the north, Taraba and Plateau to the south, Gombe and Yobe to the east, and Kaduna to the west. It takes its name from the historic town of Bauchi, which also serves as its capital city. The state was formed in 1976 when the former North-Eastern State was broken up. It originally included the area that is now Gombe State, which became a distinct state in 1996.

Of the 36 states, Bauchi is the fifth largest in area and seventh most populous with an estimated population of over 6,530,000 as of 2016. Geographically, the state is divided between the West Sudanian savanna in the south and the drier, semi-desert Sahelian savanna in the north with a small part of the montane Jos Plateau in the southwest. A key defining characteristic of the state’s landscape is Yankari National Park, a large wildlife park in southern Bauchi State that contains large populations of waterbuck, African buffalo, patas monkey, hippopotamus, roan antelope, and western hartebeest along with some of Nigeria's last remaining West African lion, African leopard, and African bush elephant populations.

What is now Bauchi State has been inhabited for years by various ethnic groups, including the Bolewa, Butawa, and Warji in the central region; the Fulani, Kanuri, and Karai-Karai in the north; the Fulani and Gerawa in and around the city of Bauchi; the Zaar (Sayawa) in the south; the Tangale in the southeast; and the Jarawa in the southwest. Religiously, the vast majority of the state's population (~85%) are Muslim with smaller Christian and traditionalist minorities at about 6% and 9%, respectively.

In the early 1800s, the Fulani jihad seized much of modern-day Bauchi State and formed the Bauchi Emirate under the Sokoto Caliphate. About 90 years later, a British expedition occupied the Emirate and incorporated it as Bauchi Province into the Northern Nigeria Protectorate which later merged into British Nigeria before becoming independent as Nigeria in 1960. Originally, modern-day Bauchi State was a part of the post-independence Northern Region until 1967 when the region was split and the area became part of the North-Eastern State. After the North-Eastern State was split, Bauchi State was formed on 3 February 1976 alongside ten other states. Twenty years after statehood, a group of LGAs in the state's west was broken off to form the new Gombe State.

As a major agriculture-based state, the Bauchi State economy partially relies on livestock and crops, such as cotton, groundnuts, millet, tomatoes, and yams with advanced irrigation schemes increasing agricultural production since statehood. Other industries include food processing and canning facilities, tin and columbite mining, and tourism in Yankari National Park and its Wikki Warm Springs.

Etymology 
According to tradition, it was named after a hunter known as Baushe, who settled in the region before the arrival of Yakubu, the first traditional ruler of Bauchi emirate (founded 1800–10).
Bauchi and Adamawa were the two main sources of freedom and tourism for the Fulani empire of Sokoto.

History
What is now known as Bauchi was until 1976 a province in the then North-Eastern State of Nigeria. According to the 2006 census, the state has a population of 4,653,066.

Bauchi State has gone through tremendous transformation over the years. The Ajawa language was spoken in Bauchi State, but became extinct by 1940 as speakers shifted to Hausa.

During the colonial era up to independence, it formed part of the Bauchi Plateau of the then Northern Region, until the 1967 state creation exercise, when the Bauchi, Borno, and Adamawa provinces constituted the former North-Eastern State.

With the creation of Bauchi State in 1976, then comprising present Bauchi and Gombe State, it included 16 local government areas. The number of local government areas in the then Bauchi State was increased to 20 and later to 23. However, in 1997 when Gombe State was created out of Bauchi and additional local governments were created in the country, Bauchi State was left with 20 local government areas as shown below.

Sharia law was adopted in June 2001.

Local Government Areas

Bauchi State consists of twenty Local Government Areas (LGAs). They are:

Geography
Bauchi State occupies a total land area of  representing about 5.3% of Nigeria's total land mass and is located between latitudes 9° 3' and 12° 3' north and longitudes 8° 50' and 11° east.

The state is bordered by seven states, Kano and Jigawa to the north, Taraba and Plateau to the south, Gombe and Yobe to the east and Kaduna to the west.

Bauchi state is one of the states in the northern part of Nigeria that span two distinctive vegetation zones, namely, the Sudan savannah and the Sahel savannah. The Sudan savannah type of vegetation covers the southern part of the state. Here, the vegetation gets richer and richer towards the south, especially along water sources or rivers, but generally the vegetation is less uniform and grasses are shorter than what grows even farther south, that is, in the forest zone of the middle belt.

The Sahel type of savannah, also known as semi-desert vegetation, becomes manifest from the middle of the state as one moves from the state's south to its north. This type of vegetation comprises isolated stands of thorny shrubs.

On the other hand, the southwestern part of the state is mountainous as a result of the continuation of the Jos Plateau, while the northern part is generally sandy.

The vegetation types as described above are conditioned by the climatic factors, which in turn determine the amount of rainfall received in the area. This pattern is because in the West Africa sub-region, rains generally come from the south as they are carried by the southwesterlies. There is therefore a progressive dryness towards the north, culminating in the desert condition in the far north. So also is the case in Bauchi state.

Consequently, rains start earlier in the southern part of the state, where rain is heaviest and lasts longer.

In the same vein, the weather experienced in the south and the north varies considerably. While it is humidly hot during the early part of the rainy season in the south, the hot, dry and dusty weather lingers up north.

In addition to rainfall, Bauchi state is watered by a number of rivers. They include the Gongola and Jama'are rivers.

The Gongola River crosses Bauchi state in Tafawa Balewa Local Government Area in the south and in Kirfi and Alkaleri Local Government Areas in the eastern part of the state, while the Jama’are River cuts across a number of Local Government Areas in the northern part of the state. Moreover, a substantial part of the Hadeja-Jama'are River basin lies in Bauchi state, which along with various fadama (floodplain) areas in the state provides suitable land for agricultural activities. These are further supported by the number of dams meant for irrigation and other purposes. These include the Gubi and Tilde-Fulani dams. There also lakes such as the Maladumba Lake in Misau Local Government Area that further provide the necessary conditions to support Agriculture.

Politics 
The State government is led by a democratically elected governor who works closely with members of the state's house of assembly. The Capital city of the State is Bauchi.

Electoral system 
The electoral  system of each state is selected using a modified two-round system. To be elected in the first round, a candidate must receive the plurality of the vote and over 25% of the vote in at least two -third of the State local government Areas. If no candidate passes threshold, a second round will be held between the top candidate and the next candidate to have received a plurality of votes in the highest number of local government Areas.

Climate change  
Like every other state in Nigeria, Bauchi state have not been spared in devastating effects of climate change. On the 11th July, 2022, the acting Director-general of the Bauchi State Emergency Management Agency (BASEMA), Mr Bala Lame, said "no fewer than 100 houses and several farmlands have been destroyed by devastating floods in Darazo LGA of the state". This he attributed to flooding after three days of persistent rainfall in the area.

Population
Bauchi State has a total of 55 tribal groups which include Gerawa, Sayawa, Jarawa, Kirfawa, Turawa Bolewa, Karekare, Kanuri, Fa'awa, Butawa, Warjawa, Zulawa, Boyawa MBadawa.   But the Fulani are the main tribe. This means that they have backgrounds, occupational patterns, beliefs and many other things that form part of the existence of the people of the state.

There are cultural similarities in the people's language, occupational practices, festivals, dress and there is a high degree of ethnic interaction especially in marriage and economic existence. Some of the ethnic groups have joking relationships that exist between them, e.g. Fulani and Kanuri, Jarawa and Sayawa, etc.

The Durbar Festival is a major annual attraction.

Education 
The Abubakar Tafawa Balewa University is located in the capital city Bauchi. Other educational institutions located in the state include Bauchi State University, Abubakar Tatari Ali Polytechnic and Federal Polytechnic, Bauchi.

Languages
West Chadic language groups spoken in Bauchi State:

North Bauchi languages
South Bauchi languages

Languages of Bauchi State listed by LGA:

Other languages of Bauchi State are Ajawa, Beele, Berom, Kanuri, Kwaami, Manga, Pero, and Piya-Kwonci.

Government 
See also: List of governors of Bauchi State

The Governor of Bauchi State is the Executive, while the State Legislature, Bauchi State House of Assembly is located in Bauchi.

Governor 
The current governor of Bauchi State is Mr. Bala AbdulKadir Mohammed who emerged victorious in the March 9, 2019 Governorship election with the political party PDP. He was sworn in on May 29, 2019, making him the 6th democratic governor of Bauchi State and the 16th governor of Bauchi State overall. Baba Tela is serving as the deputy governor of Bauchi State.

Notable people 
 Abubakar Tafawa Balewa, first and only Prime Minister of Nigeria
 Jude Rabo, vice-chancellor of Federal University, Wukari

See also 
 Bauchi Light Railway

References

External links
 

 
States of Nigeria
States and territories established in 1976